Francisco das Chagas Rodrigues Batista (born December 10, 1980), known by his nickname Pantico, is a Brazilian footballer who plays as forward for Altos.

Career statistics

References

External links

1980 births
Living people
Brazilian footballers
Association football forwards
Campeonato Brasileiro Série B players
Campeonato Brasileiro Série C players
Campeonato Brasileiro Série D players
Clube Recreativo e Atlético Catalano players
Joinville Esporte Clube players
Associação Desportiva Recreativa e Cultural Icasa players
Brusque Futebol Clube players
Sociedade Esportiva e Recreativa Caxias do Sul players
Clube Atlético Metropolitano players
Paysandu Sport Club players
Sportspeople from Piauí